Jacques Clément (1567 – 1 August 1589) was a French conspirator and the assassin of King Henry III.

He was born at Serbonnes, in today's Yonne département, in Burgundy, and became a Dominican lay brother.

During the French Wars of Religion, Clément became fanatically religious and an ardent partisan of the Catholic League. Viewing Protestantism as heresy, he talked of exterminating the Huguenots and formed a plan to assassinate Henry III in retaliation for the killing of the Duke of Guise and his brother. His project was encouraged by some of the heads of the League, in particular Catherine de Guise, the Duchess Montpensier. He was assured of worldly rewards if he succeeded and of eternal bliss if he failed. Having obtained letters for the king, he left Paris on 31 July 1589 and reached Saint-Cloud, the headquarters of Henry, who was besieging Paris, on 1 August 1589.

Assassination
Clément was admitted to the king's presence, and while he was presenting his letters he told the king he had an important and confidential message to deliver. The attendants then withdrew and, as Clément leaned in to whisper in Henry's ear, he mortally wounded him with a dagger concealed beneath his cloak. The assassin was immediately killed by the returning attendants, but Henry died early in the morning of the following day. Clément's body was later quartered and burned at the stake
. His crime led Le Laboureur to anagrammatize "Frère Jacques Clément" into "C'est l'enfer qui m'a créé" ("It is hell that created me").

Although seen by supporters of Henry III as a fanatical, brutal act, the assassination was viewed with very different feelings in Paris and by the partisans of the League. Clément was seen as a martyr and was praised by Pope Sixtus V. His praise was such that even canonization was discussed.

References

 See E Lavisse, Histoire de France, tome vi. (Paris, 1904).

1567 births
1589 deaths
French Dominicans
French Roman Catholics
16th-century Roman Catholic martyrs
16th-century venerated Christians
French people of the French Wars of Religion
French regicides
Murder in 1589